The 2001 E3 Harelbeke was the 44th edition of the E3 Harelbeke cycle race and was held on 31 March 2001. The race started and finished in Harelbeke. The race was won by Andrei Tchmil of the Lotto team.

General classification

References

2001 in Belgian sport
2001